Richard Wah Sung Tom (November 8, 1920 – February 20, 2007) was a Chinese American bantamweight weightlifter. He won a silver medal at the 1947 World Championships and a bronze at the 1948 Olympics. In 1952 he won his only national AAU title and later served as a weightlifting official. Tom was a World War II veteran. He was born in China, but his family moved to Hawaii when he was a boy. He was the first Chinese-American to compete for the United States at the Olympics.

References

External links

1920 births
2007 deaths
Weightlifters from Guangzhou
American male weightlifters
Weightlifters at the 1948 Summer Olympics
Olympic bronze medalists for the United States in weightlifting
Olympic medalists in weightlifting
American military personnel of World War II
Republic of China (1912–1949) emigrants to the United States
Medalists at the 1948 Summer Olympics
People with acquired American citizenship
Hawaii people of Chinese descent
World Weightlifting Championships medalists